Mindfulness is a peer-reviewed academic journal on psychology published by Springer Science+Business Media. The journal's founding editor, beginning with the first issue in 2010, was Nirbhay N. Singh. As of 2022, he was continuing as editor-in-chief.

Abstracting and indexing 
The journal is abstracted or indexed in:
 Scopus
 PsycINFO
 Social Sciences Citation Index
 Academic OneFile
 Current Contents Social & Behavioral Sciences 
 Health Reference Center Academic
 OCLC 
 SCImago 
 Summon by ProQuest

According to the Journal Citation Reports, the journal has a 2021 impact factor of 3.801.

References

External links 
 

Positive psychology journals
Quarterly journals
Publications established in 2010
English-language journals
Springer Science+Business Media academic journals
Mindfulness (psychology)